HMS Meteorite was an experimental U-boat developed in Germany, scuttled at the end of World War II, subsequently raised and commissioned into the Royal Navy. The submarine was originally commissioned into the Kriegsmarine on 13 March 1945 as U-1407. She was built around a Walter engine fueled by high-test peroxide (HTP).

History
U-1406 and U-1407 were scuttled on 7 May 1945 by Oberleutnant zur See Gerhard Grumpelt even though a superior officer, Kapitän zur See Kurt Thoma, had prohibited such actions. Grumpelt was subsequently sentenced to seven years' imprisonment by a British military court.

At the Potsdam Conference in July 1945 U-1406 was allocated to the United States and U-1407 to the United Kingdom, and both were soon salvaged.

Royal Navy service
U-1407 was salvaged in June 1945, and transported to Barrow-in-Furness, where she was refitted by Vickers with a new and complete set of machinery also captured in Germany, under the supervision of Professor Hellmuth Walter. Because she was intended to be used solely for trials and possibly as a high-speed anti-submarine target, her torpedo tubes were removed. She was commissioned  into the Royal Navy on 25 September 1945 and renamed HMS Meteorite.

During 1946 Meteorite carried out a series of trials under the guidance of Walter and his original team from Germaniawerft, Kiel.

Meteorite was not popular with her crews, who regarded the boat as a dangerous and volatile piece of machinery. She was difficult to control due to aircraft-type controls and a lack of forward hydroplanes. She was officially described as "75% safe".

Fate
Meteorite's Royal Navy service came to an end in September 1949, and she was broken up by Thos. W. Ward of Barrow-in-Furness.

References

Bibliography

Further reading

External links
 

German Type XVII submarines
Ships built in Hamburg
1945 ships
U-boats commissioned in 1945
U-boats scuttled in 1945
World War II submarines of Germany
Submarines of the Royal Navy
Cold War submarines of the United Kingdom
Experimental submarines
Maritime incidents in May 1945